Rusli Habibie is an Indonesian politician and the formerly governor of the province of Gorontalo. Since taking office, his social agenda has been active. Habibie requested that if schoolteachers smoke on school grounds, then people should send him photos of the offender via WhatsApp so he can reassign them to schools in more remote areas of the province as punishment.

Habibie's election was significant due to questions over his legal eligibility. He had previously been convicted of defamation of the province's former police chief and was still on probation at the time of the election.

References

1963 births
Living people
Indonesian Muslims
Golkar politicians
Governors of Gorontalo (province)